Kechana Kawal is a place located in Kachankawal Rural Municipality (previously, Kechana VDC) of Province No. 1 of Nepal. On the other hand, Mount Everest, the highest point in Nepal and on Earth, is located in Khumjung of Solukhumbu District in the same province No. 1.

References
http://www.imnepal.com/facts-things-to-know-about-country-nepal/9/

https://www.howderfamily.com/blog/lowest-elevation-in-nepal/

Jhapa District